Three Fathoms Cove or Kei Ling Ha Hoi is a cove in Tai Po District, Hong Kong.

Geography
Three Fathoms Cove is surrounded by Shap Sze Heung (Tseng Tau, Nga Yiu Tau, Sai Keng and Kei Ling Ha are along the coast), Yung Shue O, Wong Tei Tung and Sham Chung. Most of its east shore constitutes part of the Sai Kung West Country Park.

To the north the cove is connected to Tolo Harbour and the Tolo Channel. The islands of Sam Pui Chau and Wu Chau are located within the cove.

Features
A section of Three Fathoms Cove located offshore of Yung Shue O is one of the 26 designated marine fish culture zones in Hong Kong.

Conservation
Tseng Tau Coast, a coastal area of 1 km in length located north of Tseng Tau village and facing Three Fathom Cove, covering an area of 4.3 hectares, was designated as a Site of Special Scientific Interest in 1994.

References

Further reading

External links

Satellite image of Three Fathoms Coveby Google Maps

Bays of Hong Kong
Tai Po District
Ports and harbours of Hong Kong
Islands of Hong Kong
Uninhabited islands of Hong Kong